The Type 95 So-Ki was an armored railroad car of the Imperial Japanese Army. It was used for patrolling and guarding railway lines in both Manchuria and Burma. The chassis was based on the Type 95 Ha-Go light tank. The Type 95 So-Ki had light armor and no fixed weapons armament. Hand-held weapons by the crew would be the only armament available. It had a simple suspension system with bogie wheels suspended on bell cranks on each side of the chassis. The tracks were driven through the front sprockets. There were three small return wheels.

The Type 95 So-Ki was unique as it had both a track and wheel drive system. The vehicle could be changed between railway line wheels mode and track mode for ground use within a few minutes time as it had retractable wheels. In addition, the width of the wheels could be adjusted to the various widths of the rail gauges.

The Type 95 So-Ki was produced between 1935 and 1943, with 121 to 135 units made.

Notes

References 
Taki's Imperial Japanese Army Page - Akira Takizawa

Armoured cars of Japan
Armoured cars of the interwar period
World War II armoured fighting vehicles of Japan
Military vehicles introduced in the 1930s
Military draisines
Mitsubishi
Rail and road vehicle